Pablo Aguilar Bermúdez (born 9 February 1989) is a Spanish professional basketball player for the Nagasaki Velca of the B.League. He plays the power forward position.

Professional career
Aguilar signed with the Spanish League club CAI Zaragoza in 2011. In July 2013, he signed a three-year deal with Valencia BC.

On 1 August 2018 he signed with Croatian club Cedevita. On 10 November 2018 he was released by Cedevita. The same day he signed a deal with Italian club Pallacanestro Reggiana. On July 17, 2019, Aguilar signed a two-year deal with Spanish  club Iberostar Tenerife.

On October 8, 2019, he has left Iberostar Tenerife due to physical problems.

Spain national team
Aguilar has also been a member of the senior men's Spain national team. He played at EuroBasket 2013, where he won a bronze medal, and at EuroBasket 2015, where he won a gold medal.

References

External links

Euroleague.net Profile
FIBA Archive Profile
Eurobasket.com Profile
Spanish League Profile 
Draftexpress.com Profile

1989 births
Living people
ABA League players
Basket Zaragoza players
CB Gran Canaria players
CB Granada players
Centers (basketball)
Spanish expatriate basketball people in Croatia
Kawasaki Brave Thunders players
KK Cedevita players
Liga ACB players
Nagasaki Velca players
Pallacanestro Reggiana players
Power forwards (basketball)
Real Madrid Baloncesto players
Spanish expatriate basketball people in Italy
Spanish men's basketball players
Sportspeople from Granada
Valencia Basket players